Ariane Loignon (born 2 May 1965) is a Canadian speed skater. She competed in five events at the 1988 Winter Olympics.

References

External links
 

1965 births
Living people
Canadian female speed skaters
Olympic speed skaters of Canada
Speed skaters at the 1988 Winter Olympics
People from Repentigny, Quebec
20th-century Canadian women